Breyner Bonilla Montaño (born 21 July 1986) is a Colombian professional football player who plays as central defender for Orense SC.

Career
Bonilla began to play in the Colombian lower leagues, at Depor FC. He made his debut as professional in 2006, in the Depor FC squad. He stayed at Depor FC until the end of 2007. In January 2008, he was transferred to Atlético Bucaramanga. In August 2009, Jorge Bermúdez, the former Colombian international and Boca Juniors player, recommended him to Boca Juniors, who put it on trial in a friendly match against the youth team of Tigre, where he made a good impression to coach Alfio Basile. At the end of September 2009, Boca Juniors reached an agreement with Atlético Bucaramanga to loan Bonilla for one year, following the sale of Juan Forlín in Spain, at RCD Espanyol. On 19 July 2010, after previously cutting his ties with Boca Juniors, Bonilla was loaned out to Sporting Cristal for six months.

In 2019, Bonilla joined Orense SC.

References

External links
 ESPN statistics
 

1986 births
Living people
Colombian footballers
Atlético F.C. footballers
Atlético Bucaramanga footballers
Boca Juniors footballers
Sporting Cristal footballers
Cúcuta Deportivo footballers
Deportes Tolima footballers
Defensor Sporting players
Fortaleza C.E.I.F. footballers
Real Cartagena footballers
L.D.U. Loja footballers
Association football defenders
Colombian expatriate footballers
Expatriate footballers in Argentina
Expatriate footballers in Peru
Expatriate footballers in Uruguay
Categoría Primera A players
Categoría Primera B players
Argentine Primera División players
Peruvian Primera División players
Uruguayan Primera División players
People from Cúcuta